Andriy Bohdanovych Kit (born 2 November 1971) is a Ukrainian politician. He is a People's Deputy of Ukraine of the 8th and 9th convocations.

Political activity 
In 2010, he became a deputy of the Lviv Regional Council from the Strong Ukraine party. He was elected for the majority constituency in Zhydachiv district of Lviv region as a member of the UDAR political party.

In the 2012 parliamentary elections, he was a candidate for the People's Deputies of Ukraine from the single-mandate constituency No. 126 (Lviv region) from UDAR. He took second place, receiving 25.04% of the vote.

In November 2014 he was a member of the Verkhovna Rada of the eighth convocation on OVO No. 126 (Lviv region). In the same constituency, he won as a self-nominated candidate in the early parliamentary elections in 2019.

On December 6, 2019,  he became a member of the parliamentary group "Trust" (Довіра, - ukr) in the Verkhovna Rada of the 9th convocation.

Engaged in impersonal voting.

References 

Eighth convocation members of the Verkhovna Rada
Living people
1975 births
Ninth convocation members of the Verkhovna Rada
Politicians from Lviv